} (born 1975) is a Japanese novelist who is best known for his work Nakaimo - My Sister is Among Them!. In 2007, his novel Majo Rumika no Akai Ito won the Honorable Mention at the F Bunko J light novel rookie award.

Works

Novels
  (October 25, 2007 - July 25, 2008, 4 volumes)
  (Jan 23, 2009 to Jun 25, 2009, 3 volumes)
  (Sep 25, 2009 to Mar 25, 2010, 3 volumes)
  (August 25, 2010 - March 25, 2013, 11 volumes)
  (Jul 24, 2015 to Jan 25, 2016, 3 volumes): The novel adaption of the anime series of the same name.

References

1975 births
Living people
Light novelists
People from Nagoya
Writers from Aichi Prefecture